There are two species of lizard named eastern collared lizard:

 Common collared lizard, native to Mexico and the United States
 Crotaphytus insularis, native to Mexico